Damian Nowak (born 14 May 1992) is a Polish professional footballer who plays as a forward for Pogoń Siedlce.

Club career
On 7 August 2020, he signed a two-year contract with GKS Tychy.

On 1 March 2022, it was announced Nowak signed a contract until the end of the season, with a one-year extension option, with another I liga side, Sandecja Nowy Sącz.

On 7 June 2022, Nowak joined Pogoń Siedlce on a one-year deal.

References

External links

1992 births
People from Pszczyna
Sportspeople from Silesian Voivodeship
Living people
Polish footballers
Association football forwards
Podbeskidzie Bielsko-Biała players
Skra Częstochowa players
Radomiak Radom players
GKS Tychy players
Sandecja Nowy Sącz players
MKP Pogoń Siedlce players
Ekstraklasa players
I liga players
II liga players
III liga players